Paluküla is a village in Hiiumaa Parish, Hiiu County in northwestern Estonia. The population of the village was 78, with all of them being Estonians.

References 

Villages in Hiiu County